A mince pie (also mincemeat pie in North America, and fruit mince pie in Australia and New Zealand) is a sweet pie of English origin filled with mincemeat, being a mixture of fruit, spices and suet. The pies are traditionally served during the Christmas season in much of the English-speaking world. Its ingredients are traceable to the 13th century, when returning European crusaders brought with them Middle Eastern recipes containing meats, fruits, and spices; these contained the Christian symbolism of representing the gifts delivered to Jesus by the Biblical Magi. Mince pies, at Christmastide, were traditionally shaped in an oblong shape, to resemble a manger and were often topped with a depiction of the Christ Child.

The early mince pie was known by several names, including "mutton pie", "shrid pie" and "Christmas pie". Typically its ingredients were a mixture of minced meat, suet, a range of fruits, and spices such as cinnamon, cloves and nutmeg.  Served around Christmas, the savoury Christmas pie (as it became known) was associated with supposed Catholic "idolatry" and during the English Civil War was frowned on by the Puritan authorities.  Nevertheless, the tradition of eating Christmas pie in December continued through to the Victorian era, although by then its recipe had become sweeter and its size markedly reduced from the large oblong shape once observed.  Today the mince pie, usually made without meat (but often including suet or other animal fats), remains a popular seasonal treat enjoyed by many across the United Kingdom and Ireland.

History

Britain

The ingredients for the modern mince pie can be traced to the return of European crusaders from the Holy Land. Middle Eastern methods of cooking, which sometimes combined meats, fruits and spices, were popular at the time.  Pies were created from such mixtures of sweet and savoury foods; in Tudor England, shrid pies (as they were known then) were formed from shredded meat, suet and dried fruit. The addition of spices such as cinnamon, cloves and nutmeg was, according to the English antiquary John Timbs, "in token of the offerings of the Eastern Magi."  Several authors, including Timbs, viewed the pie as being derived from an old Roman custom practised during Saturnalia, where Roman fathers in the Vatican were presented with sweetmeats.  Early pies were much larger than those consumed today, and oblong shaped; the jurist John Selden presumed that "the coffin of our Christmas-Pies, in shape long, is in Imitation of the Cratch [Jesus's crib]", although writer T. F. Thistleton-Dyer thought Selden's explanation unlikely, as "in old English cookery books the crust of a pie is generally called 'the coffin'."

The modern mince pie's precursor was known by several names.  The antiquary John Brand claimed that in Elizabethan and Jacobean-era England they were known as minched pies, but other names include mutton pie, and starting in the following century, Christmas pie.  Gervase Markham's 1615 recipe recommends taking "a leg of mutton", and cutting "the best of the flesh from the bone", before adding mutton suet, pepper, salt, cloves, mace, currants, raisins, prunes, dates and orange peel.  He also suggested that beef or veal might be used in place of mutton.  In the north of England, goose was used in the pie's filling, but more generally beef tongue was also used; a North American filling recipe published in 1854 includes chopped neat's tongue, beef suet, bloom raisins, currants, mace, cloves, nutmeg, brown sugar, apples, lemons, brandy and orange peel.  During the English Civil War, along with the censure of other Catholic customs, they were banned: "Nay, the poor rosemary and bays, and Christmas pie, is made an abomination."  Puritans were opposed to the Christmas pie, on account of its connection with Catholicism.  In his History of the Rebellion, Marchamont Needham wrote "All Plums the Prophets Sons defy, And Spice-broths are too hot; Treason's in a December-Pye, And Death within the Pot."  Some considered them unfit to occupy the plate of a clergyman, causing Philo-Clericus to comment:

In his essay The Life of Samuel Butler, Samuel Johnson wrote of "an old Puritan, who was alive in my childhood ... would have none of his superstitious meats and drinks."  Another essay, published in the December 1733 issue of The Gentleman's Magazine, explained the popularity of "Christmas Pye" as perhaps "owing to the Barrenness of the Season, and the Scarcity of Fruit and Milk, to make Tarts, Custards, and other Desserts", but also possibly bearing "a religious kind of Relation to the Festivity from which it takes its Name."  The author also mentions the Quakers' objection to the treat, "who distinguish their Feasts by an heretical Sort of Pudding, known by their Names, and inveigh against Christmas Pye, as an Invention of the Scarlet Whore of Babylon, an Hodge-Podge of Superstition, Popery, the Devil and all his Works."  Nevertheless, the Christmas pie remained a popular treat at Christmas, although smaller and sweeter, and lacking in post-Reformation England any sign of supposed Catholic idolatry.  People began to prepare the fruit and spice filling months before it was required, storing it in jars, and as Britain entered the Victorian age, the addition of meat had, for many, become an afterthought (although the use of suet remains).  Its taste then was broadly similar to that experienced today, although some 20th-century writers continued to advocate the inclusion of meat.

Although the modern recipe is no longer the same list of 13 ingredients once used (representative of Christ and his 12 Apostles according to author Margaret Baker), the mince pie remains a popular Christmas treat.  Bakers Greggs reported sales of 7.5 million mince pies during Christmas 2011.  The popular claim that the consumption of mince pies on Christmas Day is illegal is an urban myth.

New England
Mincemeat pie was brought to New England by English settlers in the 17th century. While it was originally a Christmas pie, as in Britain, the Puritans did not celebrate Christmas, causing the pie's associations in the region to shift toward the American holiday of Thanksgiving. The ingredients for New England mincemeat pie are similar to the British one, with a mixture of apples, raisins, spices, and minced beef serving as the filling. Later recipes sometimes omit the beef, though "None Such" (now owned by The J.M. Smucker Company), the major brand of condensed American mincemeat, still contains beef. New England mincemeat pies are usually full-sized pies, as opposed to the individual-sized pies now common in Britain.

See also

 Christmas pudding
 List of fruit dishes
 List of pies, tarts and flans
 Stir-up Sunday

References
Footnotes

Notes

Bibliography

Further reading

 
 

British desserts
British pies
New Zealand pies
Christmas food
English cuisine
Fruit pies

he:Mincemeat#Mince pie